Caripeta aequaliaria, known generally as the red girdle or western conifer looper, is a species of geometrid moth in the family Geometridae. It is found in North America.

The MONA or Hodges number for Caripeta aequaliaria is 6865.

References

Further reading

External links

 

Ourapterygini
Articles created by Qbugbot
Moths described in 1883